The Victoria Louise class of protected cruisers was the last class of ships of that type built for the German Imperial Navy. The class design introduced the combined clipper and ram bow and the blocky sides that typified later German armored cruisers. The ships were laid down in 1895–1896, and were launched in 1897–1898 and commissioned into the fleet over the following year.

All five ships were armed with a main battery of two  guns and eight  guns. Problems with the Niclausse boilers installed on Freya prompted the Navy to standardize boiler types in future warships.

The ships of the class served in various units in the German fleet, including on the America Station, in the East Asia Squadron, and with the home fleet. Hertha and Hansa participated in the suppression of the Boxer Uprising in China in 1900, and Vineta was involved in the Venezuela Crisis of 1902–1903. All five ships were modernized between 1905 and 1911, after which they served as training ships for naval cadets. They were mobilized into V Scouting Group at the outbreak of World War I in August 1914, but were quickly withdrawn from front-line service. They served in various secondary roles for the rest of the war. After the end of the conflict, Victoria Louise was converted into a merchant ship, but was broken up in 1923. The other four ships were scrapped in 1920–1921.

Design

In the early 1890s, elements in the German naval command structure grappled with what type of cruiser ought to be built to fulfill the various needs of the fleet. At the time, the German navy lacked the budget to build dedicated overseas cruisers along with vessels optimized for scouting purposes. The budgetary constraints led to designers attempting to build ships that could fulfill both roles, though the high speed, heavy armament, and thick armor necessary for fleet operations necessarily conflicted with the needs of a colonial cruiser, which required a long cruising radius.

After failing to secure budgetary approval for the new ships from the Reichstag (Imperial Diet) in 1892, 1893, and 1894, the Reichstag finally authorized construction of three ships for the 1895–1896 budget year. The RMA's proposal was chosen and three 6,000-ton cruisers were begun in 1895. Two more vessels were authorized for 1896–1897.

Compared to Kaiserin Augusta, Victoria Louise had a displacement that was about six percent less, though she carried a much heavier armament The resulting design were smaller scale versions of the contemporary s; they featured the same fore military mast and pole mainmast and a combination of gun turrets and casemates for the secondary battery. As was common practice in the German fleet in the 1890s, the five ships employed different types of water-tube boilers for evaluation purposes. The ships' design set a precedent for later armored cruisers, with large, bulky sides and a combined clipper bow and ram.

General characteristics

The ships' hulls were constructed with longitudinal and transverse steel frames; a single layer of wood planks were used for the hull. This sheathing was later removed from Victoria Louise, Hertha, and Freya. The hull was divided into twelve watertight compartments, which were later reduced to eleven, with the exception of Freya. The hull also incorporated a double bottom that extended for 60 percent of the length of the hull. 

The ships' standard crew was 31 officers and 446 enlisted men, with an additional 9 officers and 41 enlisted while serving as a second command flagship. After their reconstruction into training ships, the crew was substantially enlarged to incorporate the trainees, with 26 officers and 658 sailors, 75 of whom were naval cadets and 300 others were cabin boys. The ships carried a number of smaller boats, including three picket boats, one launch, one pinnace, two cutters, two yawls, and three dinghies. After their modernization, the boats were significantly revised; the number of picket boats was reduced to one, a barge and a launch were added, the dinghies were removed, and five more cutters were added.

The ships were good sea boats; they had an easy motion and were dry as a result of their high forecastles. They had a tendency to pitch when steaming downwind, however, and made severe leeway in heavy winds because of their large superstructures. They were difficult to maneuver without the center shaft engaged. Steering was controlled with a single rudder. They lost only around ten percent speed in a head sea or with the rudder hard over. In addition, as the lower coal bunkers were emptied, the ships became increasingly unstable; with empty bunkers, the ships could heel over as much as fifteen degrees in a hard turn. The modernization of the ships between 1905 and 1911 rectified this problem. As built, the ships were very hot, and ventilation had to be improved before they were commissioned.

Machinery
The propulsion system of all five ships consisted of three vertical 4-cylinder triple-expansion steam engines built by AG Vulcan. Steam was provided by twelve coal-fired water-tube boilers from different manufacturers, with the exception of Hansa, which received eighteen boilers. Victoria Louise and Vineta had boilers from Dürr AG, Freya had Niclausse boilers, and Hertha had Belleville boilers. Hansa was equipped with eighteen transverse Belleville boilers. The Niclausse boilers in Freya proved to be particularly troublesome, which led the Navy to use only Schulz-Thornycroft or Marine-type boilers in future vessels. The boilers were ducted into three funnels, though after their modernization between 1905 and 1908, they were trunked into two funnels.

Armament and armor

The ships' primary armament consisted of two 21 cm SK L/40 C/97 built-up guns in single gun turrets, one forward and one aft. The turrets were C/97 type mounts, which were hydraulically operated and hand-loaded. The guns were supplied with 58 rounds of ammunition each; these were  shells.

Eight 15 cm SK L/40 guns rounded out the offensive gun armament. Four of these guns were mounted in turrets amidships and the other four were placed in casemates. These guns fired armor-piercing shells at a rate of 4 to 5 per minute. The guns could depress to −7 degrees and elevate to 20 degrees, for a maximum range of 13,700 m (14,990 yd). The guns were manually elevated and trained. Two of the 15 cm guns were removed in the refit.

For defense against torpedo boats, the ships also carried ten 8.8 cm SK L/30 naval guns, and an eleventh was added during the modernization. These were also mounted individually in casemates and pivot mounts. These guns fired  shell at a muzzle velocity of 590 mps (1,936 fps). The gun mounts were manually operated. Three longer-barreled 8.8 cm SK L/35 naval guns were also added at that time. The gun armament was rounded out by ten  Maxim machine cannon, which were removed during the refit.

The ships were also equipped with three  torpedo tubes with eight torpedoes, two launchers were mounted on the broadside and the third was in the bow, all below the waterline. These weapons were 5.1 m (201 in) long and carried an 87.5 kg (193 lb) TNT warhead. They could be set at two speeds for different ranges. At , the torpedoes had a range of 800 m (870 yd).

In 1916, all of the ships of the class were disarmed, with the exception of Freya, which was re-equipped with a single 15 cm gun, four 10.5 cm SK L/45 guns, and fourteen 8.8 cm guns of both the L/30 and L/35 versions, for use as a gunnery training ship.

Armor protection for the ships was composed of Krupp steel. The 21 cm and 15 cm gun turrets had 100 mm thick sides and 30 mm thick roofs. The casemate guns were also given 100 mm worth of armor protection. The ships were also equipped with cork cofferdams.

Construction

Service history

Victoria Louise

Victoria Louise served with the fleet for the first seven years of her career. During this time, she represented Germany during the funeral of Queen Victoria in 1901. In 1906, she was modernized and after 1908, used as a training ship for naval cadets. In 1909, she visited the United States, and at the outbreak of World War I, was mobilized into V Scouting Group. She was attacked unsuccessfully by the British submarine  in October 1914, and at the end of the year she was withdrawn from service. She was used as a minelayer and barracks ship based in Danzig for the rest of the war. Victoria Louise was sold in 1919 and converted into a freighter the following year, though she served in this capacity until 1923, when she was broken up for scrap.

Hertha

Hertha served abroad in the German East Asia Squadron for the first six years of her career; she served briefly as the squadron flagship in 1900. She contributed a landing party to the force that captured the Taku Forts during the Boxer Uprising in 1900. After returning to Germany in 1905, she was modernized and used as a training ship in 1908, following the completion of the refit. She served in that capacity for the next six years. At the outbreak of World War I, Hertha was mobilized into V Scouting Group, but served in front-line duty only briefly. She was used as a barracks ship after 1915, and ultimately sold for scrapping in 1920.

Freya

Freya served in the German fleet for the initial years of her career, unlike her sister ships, all of which served abroad on foreign stations. As a result, she led a fairly uneventful career in the fleet. After a modernization in 1905–1907, Freya was used as a school ship for cadets. While visiting Canada in 1908, she accidentally rammed and sank a Canadian schooner, killing nine sailors. At the outbreak of World War I, Freya was mobilized into V Scouting Group, but served in front-line duty only briefly. She was used as a barracks ship after 1915, and ultimately sold for scrapping in 1921.

Vineta

Vineta served abroad in the American Station for the first several years of her career. While on station in the Americas, she participated in the Venezuela Crisis of 1902–1903 and bombarded several Venezuelan fortresses. She returned to Germany in 1905 and was used as a torpedo training ship in 1908. She was modernized in 1909–1911, after which she was used as a school ship for naval cadets. In November 1912, she participated in an international naval protest of the First Balkan War. At the outbreak of World War I, Vineta was mobilized into V Scouting Group like her sisters, but served in front-line duty only briefly. She was used as a barracks ship after 1915, and ultimately sold for scrapping in 1920.

Hansa

Hansa served abroad in the East Asia Squadron for the first six years of her career. Along with Hertha, she contributed a landing party to the force that captured the Taku Forts during the Boxer Uprising. In August 1904, she participated in the internment of the Russian battleship Tsesarevich after the Battle of the Yellow Sea during the Russo-Japanese War. After returning to Germany in 1906, she was modernized and used as a training ship in 1909, following the completion of the refit. At the outbreak of World War I, Hansa was mobilized into V Scouting Group, but served in front-line duty only briefly. She was used as a barracks ship after 1915, and ultimately sold for scrapping in 1920.

Notes

References

Further reading
 

Cruiser classes
 
World War I cruisers of Germany